The 1978 World Tour was the first concert tour by American hard rock band Van Halen. The world tour, which was in support of their debut album, covered mainly North America with 124 shows in the United States and two shows in Canada, 39 shows in Europe, and nine shows in Japan. At 174 shows total over a 10-month period, the tour was one of the band's most extensive overall. Throughout the tour Van Halen was mostly a supporting act for bands such as Black Sabbath and Journey, however, Van Halen headlined shows in Europe and Japan.

Background

First North American leg 
See also Infinity Tour
Van Halen started their first leg opening for acts Montrose and Journey. Herbie Herbert, the manager for Journey at the time, recalled bringing guitarist Neal Schon of Journey along with him to go see the band in New York to a sold out audience of 3,500 people.

Opening for Black Sabbath 
See also Never Say Die! Tour (Black Sabbath)

"We did 23 shows in 25 days," recalled Eddie Van Halen regarding the European leg. "I didn't know they had that many places! But to meet Tony Iommi when I was so into him was really incredible." David Lee Roth summed up the experience as "a real shot in the ass". The Liverpool Empire Theatre date was attended by future members of Apollo 440 – who, in 1997, issued an adaptation of Van Halen's 'Ain't Talkin' 'bout Love' as 'Ain't Talkin' 'bout Dub'.

"We had a great time with the Sabbath guys…" recalled Alex Van Halen. "It was really special because Ed and I were big fans of the band. Every time they came to LA, I was out there in the audience, fighting tooth and nail to get to the front so I could get my eardrums destroyed. But I learnt a lot from them about audience participation… One time, we were up near Leicester, about half an hour before showtime, and Ozzy and Bill Ward were out there on the front lawn with the punters, having a beer. I thought, 'Fuck me, none of this star-type shit.' I was really impressed."

"Ozzy used to tell a funny story…" recalled onetime Osbourne sidekick Don Airey. "Sabbath had done a tour for a year [sic] with Kiss… and it nearly killed him because Kiss had been so good. And he said, 'We're never doing that again. Next tour, we just want a bar band from LA. That's all we want.' And then he got to the first gig. Ozzy said they walked in as 'Eruption' was going on. Ozzy said, 'We just went into the dressing room. We sat there going, That was incredible… and then it finished, and we were just too stunned to speak. Then there was a knock on the door and the best-looking man in the world walked in and said, Hello' – you know, David Lee Roth. I think they only lasted about two months on that tour. Then the record broke… I went to see them at the Rainbow when they supported Sabbath. By the time they played the Rainbow again a month later, they were headlining. Incredible!"

Of the North American leg of the tour, Ozzy Osbourne said: "Van Halen are so good they ought to be headlining the tour."

Setlist

Songs played overall
"On Fire"
"I'm the One"
Michael Anthony bass solo
"Runnin' with the Devil"
"Atomic Punk"
Alex Van Halen drum solo
"Jamie's Cryin'"
"Little Dreamer"
"Last Night"
"Down in Flames"
"Feel Your Love Tonight"
"Ain't Talkin' 'Bout Love"
"Voodoo Queen"
"Ice Cream Man" ("John Brim" cover)
"Somebody Get Me a Doctor"
Eddie Van Halen guitar solo featuring "Eruption"
"You Really Got Me" ("The Kinks" cover)
Encore
"D.O.A."
"Bottoms Up!"
"Summertime Blues" ("Eddie Cochran" cover)

Typical set list
"On Fire"
"I'm the One"
Michael Anthony bass solo
"Runnin' with the Devil"
"Atomic Punk"
Alex Van Halen drum solo
"Jamie's Cryin'"
"Little Dreamer"
"Feel Your Love Tonight"
"Ain't Talkin' 'Bout Love"
"Ice Cream Man" ("John Brim" cover)
Eddie Van Halen guitar solo featuring "Eruption"
"You Really Got Me" ("The Kinks" cover)
Encore
"D.O.A."
"Bottoms Up!"

Tour dates

Box office score data

Personnel
Eddie Van Halen – guitar and background vocals
David Lee Roth – lead vocals and acoustic guitar
Michael Anthony – bass and background vocals
Alex Van Halen – drums

References

Bibliography
 

Van Halen concert tours
1978 concert tours